The Tunisia national badminton team represents Tunisia in international team competitions. The Tunisian national team is managed by the Tunisian Badminton Federation (Tunisian: الجامعة التونسية للريشة الطائرة; FTBAD). The men's team debuted in the African Badminton Championships in 2018. 

The Tunisian mixed team debuted in the 2019 African Games. The team were eliminated in the group stages.

Participation in BCA competitions 

Men's team

Participation in Africa Games

Current squad 

Male players
Rahali Mouin
Khayati Ouzaier
Drira Mohamed Yassine
Rabah El Mootez Belleh
Youssef Hafouz
Yessine Vydelingum
Younes Hafouz
Amin Abidi
Najmedine Shabani

Female players
Elaa Khedhiri
Sarra Hamroun
Hachani Fatma
Wiem Ben Ahmed
Safa Jebali

References 

Badminton
National badminton teams
Badminton in Tunisia